Pennsylvania State Senate District 10 includes parts of Bucks County. It is currently represented by Democrat Steve Santarsiero.

District profile
The district includes the following areas:

 Bristol
 Bristol Township
 Buckingham Township
 Chalfont
 Doylestown
 Doylestown Township
 Falls Township
 Lower Makefield Township
 Morrisville
 New Britain
 New Britain Township
 New Hope
 Newtown
 Newtown Township
 Plumstead Township
 Solebury Township
 Tullytown
 Upper Makefield Township
 Yardley

Senators

Recent election results

References

Pennsylvania Senate districts
Government of Bucks County, Pennsylvania